M.A.C.E. Music, Inc. is an American record label founded by Michael Angelo Batio in April 1993. Currently based in Gurnee, Illinois, the label's main job is that of selling material and merchandise of Batio's, including his albums, videos and accessories such as the "MAB String Dampener". The label also releases material by other artists, including Batio's side-project C4, T. D. Clark, Tom Kopyto and The Flyin' Ryan Brothers. M.A.C.E. distributes material both directly and through other labels, to over 40 countries worldwide including the United States, the United Kingdom, all throughout Europe, Canada, Japan, Qatar, South Africa, Australia, Mexico and Brazil.

M.A.C.E. has its own recording studio in Gurnee called Monster Mix, which has been the location of the recording of some of the later Batio material, most notably Lucid Intervals and Moments of Clarity Part 2 and 2 X Again. Earlier albums like No Boundaries and Planet Gemini were recorded at an old studio owned by the label, known simply as M.A.C.E. Studios.

M.A.C.E. allocates each artist on the label a number group, and all of their releases are given an issue number within this group. For example, Michael Fath CDs are all numbered as 3xx, from 301 to 310, and Lyden Moon CDs are numbered 202 to 204.

Artists and releases

C4
108: Call to Arms
The Flyin' Ryan Brothers
261: Sibling Revelry
262: Colorama
264: The Chaos Sampler
265: Legacy
Francesco Fareri
281: Suspension
Holland
Wake Up the Neighbourhood
Jimmy Ryan
263: Finally
Katrina Johansson
Guitarsongs Volume 1
Kiloton
243: The Seeds of Genocide
244: Knock the Box
Kopecky
222: Serpentine Kaleidoscope
223: Orion
Lyden Moon
202: Supersonic Musical Voyage
203: In the Groove
204: Fire It Up
Michael Angelo Batio
101: No Boundaries
102: Planet Gemini
103: Lucid Intervals and Moments of Clarity Part 2
109: Holiday Strings
110: Hands Without Shadows
111: 2 X Again
601: Performance
602: 25 Jazz Progressions
603: MAB Jam Session
701: Speed Kills702: Speed Lives703: Speed Kills 2704: Speed Kills 3Michael Fath
301: Sonic Tapestries302: Suspended Animation303: Baptism By Desire304: Shake305: Country Squire306: Flick of the Wrist307: Profile308: Songs for Marie309: The Early Years310: Yesterday's ChildNitro
107: Gunnin' for GloryRichard Jessee Project
282: INTRO-P283: OstinatoRoss Butterfield
241: A Major Nuisance242: Post Traumatic Shred DisorderT.D. Clark
251: Personalities252: PerspectiveThe Tobias Hurwitz Band
291: Zen Shred ZoneTom Kopyto
272: YTK''

See also
List of record labels

References

External links
Official site

American record labels
Record labels established in 1993
Companies based in Lake County, Illinois
Gurnee, Illinois